Tikki Tikki Tembo is a 1968 picture book written by Arlene Mosel and illustrated by Blair Lent.  The book tells the story of a Chinese boy with a long name who falls into a well.  It is a sort of origin myth about why Chinese names are so short today.

Plot
Tikki Tikki Tembo is set in ancient China and invents an ancient Chinese custom whereby parents honor their first-born sons with long, elaborate names that everyone is obliged to say completelyno nicknames, no shortening of any kindwhile second-born sons are typically given short, unimportant names.  A boy named Tikki Tikki Tembo-no Sa Rembo-chari Bari Ruchi-pip Peri Pembo ("The Most Wonderful Thing in the Whole Wide World") and his little brother Chang ("Little or Nothing") are playing very close to a well at their house that their mother has warned them to avoid. Chang falls in the well and his older brother runs to their mother and tells her Chang has fallen down the well. Their mother tells him to get the Old Man with the Ladder. He goes and tells the Old Man. Chang is rescued and then recovers quickly. Some time later, the boys are again playing near the well. This time, the older brother falls in. Chang runs to their mother and tries to tell her that "Tikki Tikki Tembo-no Sa Rembo-chari Bari Ruchi-pip Peri Pembo has fallen into the well." At first she cannot hear him so he says it again. However, because Chang is out of breath from running he sputters and then mispronounces the name. His mother insists that he repeat the namebut with respect. He tries repeatedly until finally his mother tells Chang to get the Old Man with the Ladder. Chang goes to the Old Man with the Ladder. Initially, the old man does not respond because he is asleep. Further, when Chang tries to wake him up, the Old Man with the Ladderannoyedtries to fall back asleep. After Chang breathlessly repeats his brother's predicament the Old Man goes with Chang to save his brother from the well. They get Tikki Tikki Tembo-no Sa Rembo-chari Bari Ruchi-pip Peri Pembo from the well, but because of the long time he was in the well, it takes longer for him to recover. The end of the story says that this is why the Chinese have short names.

Reception
The book received accolades upon publication.  The Kirkus Review found the illustrations to be "a skillful counterpoint of diminutive detail and spacious landscape and a fine setting for a sprightly folktale." The book won a 1968 Boston Globe–Horn Book Award in the Picture Book category.

In 1997, The New York Times selected it as one of the 59 children's books of the previous 50 years. In a 1999–2000 National Education Association online survey of children, the book was one of the "Kids' Top 100 Books". Based on a 2007 online poll, the National Education Association listed the book as one of its "Teachers' Top 100 Books for Children". In a 2008 online poll of "Top 100 Picture Books" by School Library Journal, the book ranked 35th; in a similar 2012 poll, the book ranked 89th. According to the publisher, over one million copies of the book had been sold by 2013.

The 2009 audio book version of the story received a Parents' Choice Foundation rating of "Approved".

Criticisms and inaccuracies
It has been criticized for "reinforc[ing] the stereotype that Asian names sound like nonsense syllables", especially as the name of the title character is nothing like actual Chinese.

Background

The publisher states that the author "first heard the story ... as a child" and that the book is "her own" retelling of it. There are previous stories also set in China. However, the story is thought to have come from Japan rather than from China.

Similar tales have been introduced to the United States several times.

From Japan
In 1900, a poem "Teki-teki-no. A little Jap tragedy" by Jerome D. Greene appeared on The Century Magazine. A child
"Teki-teki-no, teki-suri-ombo, so-take-nudo, Harima-no-betto, Cha-wan-chaus'no, Fushimi-no-Esuke"
drowns in the well. No sibling is mentioned in this version. Jerome Davis Greene was an American born in Yokohama, Japan. He moved to the United States and later became a businessman and organizer of Japanese studies.

Japanese Novelist Etsu Inagaki Sugimoto introduced a tale "The long-life name" in a 1918's issue of children's magazine Everyland. It tells that a child was given a long name, in a wish to live for long. But the child
"Het-toko het-toko hengo-no-kami, ik-kai nui-do waniudo, gaga-no fun-nai-sama, oodep-po kodep-po, sasara dep-po hibashi, ja-jan-janjan"
drowns in the well. Sugimoto notes that she learned this tale during her childhood from her nurse.

non-Japanese elements

In 1924, the National Association of Junior Chautauquas published a book that contained a story by an anonymous author entitled "Tiki-Tiki-Tembo"; the story concerned a boy "in old Japan" named:
"Tiki-tiki-tembo-no sa rembo-Hari bari broohski-Peri pen do-Hiki pon pom-Nichi no miano-Dom bori ko"
and his neglected sibling "Choi". After falling into the well, the title character "never grew up to be a fine Japanese man." It concludes that "And now in old Japan," boys are given tiny short names such as "Su", "Foy", "Wang", or "Sing". There are some non-Japanese elements in this version. A book published in 1968 (the same year as Tikki Tikki Tembo) reprinted the 1924 version of the story.

An early instance of Chinese setting is a 1941 audio recording titled "Long-Name-No-Can-Say", adapted and narrated by Paul Wing.
A boy named
"Nicki Nicki Tembo No So Rembo Ooma Moochi Gamma Gamma Goochi"
is fat and mean. He has 7 siblings: 6 elder sisters "Humph", "Lumph", "Mumph", "Bumph", "Dumph", "Gumph", and a younger brother "Yen". "Nicki Nicki Tembo" falls into a well, but is eventually rescued.
1941 was in a time of strong anti-Japanese sentiment in the United States.

Another recording titled "Sticky Sticky Stembo" was written by Selma R. Rich in 1953.

1960s
There was a wave of publications through 1959 to 1961: a song by the Brothers Four, Shari Lewis's recording, a reissue of Paul Wing's recording, a book by Bryna Untermeyer, and possibly a narration on TV.

The Brothers Four's song "Sama Kama Wacky Brown" (lyrics by Ed Warren), from their eponymous first album in 1960, sings about
"Eddie Koochy Katcha Kama Tosa Neera Tosa Noka Sama Kama Wacky Brown"
who "fell into the deep, dark well" and drowned. The song is sometimes called "Eddie Brown".

Lamb Chop's puppeteer Shari Lewis released a story record "Tiki Tiki Timbo" around 1959. In the song, the older brother's name is
"Tiki Tiki Timbo No Sin Nimbo Hoi Boi Boski Poi Pon Do Hiki Pon Pon Niki No Mi Ah Dom Poi"
and his younger brother is "Choi". Tiki Tiki Timbo drowns in the well.

The 1960 reissue of Paul Wing's "Long-Name-No-Can-Say" narration is an omnibus with another fairytale that also has 7 supportive characters: Walt Disney's Snow White and the Seven Dwarfs.

A story published in 1961, called "The Little Boy With the Long Name", featured an older brother named
"Sticky Sticky Stumbo Nos E Rumbo E Pro Pennyo Hara Bara Brisko Nicky Prom Po Nish No Mennyo Dumbricko",
named so in a belief that long name causes longevity.
The story ends with the boy's death by drowning. The editor of this version is Bryna Ivens Untermeyer.

1967–1969 saw another wave: an LP record containing the 1961 Untermeyer's "Sticky Sticky Stumbo" version, Mosel's book, a reprint of the 1924 anonymous version, and Monty Python's TV show (1969 in UK, around 1974 in the US).

The Child with a Long Name
Japanese folklore studies classify Tikki Tikki Tembo-like tales as tale type NMS 638 The Child with a Long Name.

A typical specimen in Japanese folklore (reported in 1932):
The first child was given a convenient short name , but it soon dies. The parents think it must be because the name was too short, so they give their next child a long name:
Itchōgiri nichōgiri chōnai chōzaburō gorogoroyamano gorohēsaku atchiyama kotchiyama torino tossaka tateeboshi tonkarabyō
One day the child falls into a well. His friend goes to a house nearby and asks for a ladder, but the old woman there is deaf, so by the time the friend manages to bring the ladder, the child with a long name is dead.

Opinions vary regarding the similarity between NMS 638 The Child with a Long Name in Japan and folklore in other cultures. Keigo Seki assigns no equivalent Aarne–Thompson index (AT index), a comprehensive code system of European folktales.  considers it partially similar to AT 1562A Barn is Burning. Inada finds no equivalent type indice in Korean folklore studies or in Chinese folklore studies. Folklorist D. L. Ashliman does not assign any AT index either, but remarks that the pattern in Tikki Tikki Tembo follows AT2021A .

History in Japan
A precursor, fables and jokes about people with long names, appeared at least by the 15th century. A manuscript written around 1490 has a fable about a nun who made up a "long" dharma name: "", for herself. The manuscript is based on an earlier book of Buddhist fables. The nun's invention is a combination of Buddhist saints, deities and concepts. The moral is that such naming is a sign of greed, which is against Buddhist teachings.

An early full-formed version of The Child with a Long Name is the story published in 1703, "" ('Sunk down the waters for greed'), in a printed book of jokes created by  comedian Yonezawa Hikohachi.
A stepmother renames her sons. The stepson whom she hates is given a short name , and her precious own son is given a long . One day,  falls into a river, but people swiftly rescue him. Another day, the mother's own son is swept by the river. She cries "Somebody, please!  is drowning!", but the boy is lost while she was calling out.
The punchline is a Japanese pun involving the word .

Tekitekini...
A printed book of horror stories published in 1805 contains "" ('A tale of a man who named his son with a strange name, and regretted it').
A man wishes to name his first son with a unique and long name. He consults a Confucian scholar, who recommends the name Mr. . A tutor of Japanese poetry sneers at this, opposing such use of foreign language to name a Japanese's son. The tutor proposes , a traditional poem of good fortune. The scholar and the tutor starts quarrelling, so the father decides to make the name by himself. He solemnly declares it will be:
.

One day, the boy falls into a well. People panic to rescue the boy, but for every message they recite the long name. The boy dies, "blue and swollen".
The story gives no explanation of the origin or meanings of "Tekitekini". The book was written by a storywriter and storyteller with pen name .

Polymath Minakata Kumagusu reported in 1913 a tongue twister  he learned 30 years ago, although this was played as a tongue twister, not a tale.

Jugemu
"" is a very popular version in Japan today . It is a  comedy, and a 1912 document suggests that it may have existed since the mid-19th century. Extant records of the name "" date back to 1884, and the full story from 1912. A typical version in 2022 goes:
A child is named
Jugemu Jugemu Gokō-no surikire Kaijarisuigyo-no Suigyōmatsu Unraimatsu Fūraimatsu Kūnerutokoro-ni Sumutokoro Yaburakōji-no burakōji Paipopaipo Paipo-no Shūringan Shūringan-no Gūrindai Gūrindai-no Ponpokopī-no Ponpokonā-no Chōkyūmei-no Chōsuke
One day he hits his friend's head, causing a bump. The friend protests to Jugemu's parents. But while reciting Jugemu's name, the bump heals, so evidence is lost.

"Jugemu" differs from typical The Child with a Long Name-type tales in that Jugemu himself does not suffer at all.

According to a memoire published in 1927, there was another  performed around the 1880s.
The first child is named by a Shinto priest, but dies in infancy. So the parents ask a Buddhist priest to name their second child. The name is:
Animanimanimamane shiresharite shyamiyashyai taisentemokutemokute aishabisoishabi shaeashae shamiyaarokyabashabishyani abendaranebite atandahareshite ukuremukure arareharare shugyashiasanmasanbi budabikkiridjitchi darumaharishude sogyanekushane bashabashashudaimandarā
It is taken from a dharani (Buddhist chants in Sanskrit). One day the child falls into a well and drowns.
The punchline is a black humor relating Buddhist chants to Japanese funerals.

Folklore 
Systematic collection of Japanese folklore began in the 1910's. A summary compilation published in 1958 lists 66 samples of The Child with a Long Name-type folktales in Japan.

Motifs 

Remarks like "That's why now people won't use too long names." can be seen in Japanese versions, such as a fairytale in an 1896 children's magazine.

Editions and translations
Scholastic records released an LP record of the story in 1968.  Weston Woods Studios produced a filmstrip and cassette tape version in 1970, which was later distributed on VHS and DVD.

Translations of the book include:
Tikki Tikki tembo (1975, Afrikaans)
Eka Tikki Tikki Tembo (1976, Zulu)
Tikki, Tikki, Tembo (1994, Spanish)
Tikki tikki tembo (1995, Xhosa)

In popular culture

Tikki Tikki Tembo in popular culture

 In 1971 Canadian composer Harry Freedman set the story to music. His 10-minute work, entitled Tikki Tikki Tembo, is scored for narrator and woodwind quintet.
A 1975 jazz album Brown Rice by Don Cherry contains the song "Brown Rice", in which the artist refers to Tikki Tikki Tembo.
 A 1990 punk rock album by the band Cringer was titled Tikki Tikki Tembo No Sa Rembo Chari Bari Ruchi Pip Peri Pembo.
 The 2003 Christmas decorations at the White House included a depiction of a scene from Tikki Tikki Tembo.
 A song by Welsh group Anweledig on their 2004 EP Byw is titled "Tikki Tikki Tembo" and tells some of the story.
The 2010 song "Wildstyle Method" by Bassnectar says Tikki Tikki Tembo's full name during certain parts of the song.
A variation of the tale was featured in an episode of Lamb Chop's Play-Along.

The Gamma Goochee
A 1965 pop rock song "(You Got) The Gamma Goochee" by Gamma Goochee Himself (John Mangiagli) chants
"Nicki Nicki Nimbo No So Limbo Oo Ma Moochi Gamma Gamma Goochee"
of "Long-Name-No-Can-Say". The song was covered by The Kingsmen (1965) whiched ranked #98 in Cashbox (magazine) singles. It was covered by other musicians too, such as The Persian Market (spelled "The Gamma Goochie"), and Joe Walsh (1991).

Monty Python
British comedy series Monty Python's Flying Circus aired a sketch "":
In a biography program of a German baroque composer named
"Johann Gambolputty de von Ausfern-schplenden-schlitter-crasscrenbon-fried-digger-dingle-dangle-dongle-dungle-burstein-von-knacker-thrasher-apple-banger-horowitz-ticolensic-grander-knotty-spelltinkle-grandlich-grumblemeyer-spelterwasser-kurstlich-himbleeisen-bahnwagen-gutenabend-bitte-ein-nürnburger-bratwustle-gerspurten-mitz-weimache-luber-hundsfut-gumeraber-shönendanker-kalbsfleisch-mittler-aucher von Hautkopft of Ulm",
Johann's last surviving relative is interviewed, whose name is
"Karl Gambolputty de von Ausfern..."
But while Karl and the interviewer are reciting Johann's full name, Karl dies. The interviewer digs a grave for Karl.
The episode was first aired in 1969 in the UK, and around 1974 in the U.S.

See also

 Jugemu, a similar story from Japan.

Footnotes

Notes

References

External links
 
 "Long Name No Can Say", told by Paul Wing
  
 

1968 children's books
Children's fiction books
American picture books
Children's books about China
Child characters in literature
Holt, Rinehart and Winston books
Picture books by Arlene Mosel
Cases of people who fell into a well in fiction